Reed Brody is a Hungarian-American human rights lawyer and the author of To Catch a Dictator: The Pursuit and Trial of Hissène Habré. He specializes in helping victims pursue abusive leaders for atrocities, and has gained fame as the "Dictator Hunter" (a name he eschews).  He worked as counsel for the victims in the case of the exiled former dictator of Chad, Hissène Habré – who was convicted of crimes against humanity in Senegal - and has worked with the victims of Augusto Pinochet and Jean-Claude “Baby Doc” Duvalier. He currently works with victims of the former dictator of Gambia, Yahya Jammeh.

Early life and education 

Brody was born in Budapest, Hungary, in 1953. His father, Ervin Brody, a Hungarian Jew, spent three years in German labor camps before emigrating to the United States and teaching at Fairleigh Dickinson University. His mother, Francesca Cash, was an artist and an arts teacher at a Brooklyn inner-city school.

Brody received his Bachelor of Arts in Political Science from Fairleigh Dickinson University where he was Student Government President and a leader in the anti-Vietnam War movement. He earned his J.D. degree from Columbia University School of Law. While a law student, Brody worked a year in Paris as a teaching assistant at the Université de Paris (Panthéon-Sorbonne). Brody holds an honorary doctorate from Fairleigh Dickinson University and was awarded a Public Interest Achievement Award by Columbia University Law School.

Career 

After law school, Brody worked as New York State Assistant Attorney General from 1980 to 1984 where he authored consumer protection laws and advocated on behalf of consumers and workers in class action-type suits against large corporations and financial institutions. He was called "the leading expert in the country on career-counseling malpractices.”
 
Brody left his position as Assistant Attorney General to research and uncover a pattern of atrocities against Nicaraguan civilians by US-funded "contras". His report, Contra Terror in Nicaragua received national front-page coverage and led to U.S. Congressional hearings and a temporary halt to contra funding. Brody conducted a speaking tour of over 60 U.S. cities and appeared as co-counsel with the Center for Constitutional Rights in litigation in U.S. federal court to stop U.S. aid to contras. His report was also introduced into evidence in the case Nicaragua v. United States at the International Court of Justice in The Hague. He was attacked by United States President Ronald Reagan, who called him a Sandinista "sympathizer".
 
From 1987 until 1991, Brody worked for the International Commission of Jurists in Geneva, as the Director of its Centre for the Independence of Judges and Lawyers (CIJL), where he organized campaigns on behalf of harassed and/or detained jurists and engaged in high-level regional and national seminars on the independence of numerous judiciary systems around the world. Together with P. N. Bhagwati, former Chief Justice of India, he assisted the government of Mongolia on behalf of the United Nations in preparing its 1991 constitution.

In 1992, Brody became Executive Director of the International Human Rights Law Group (now Global Rights), where he served until 1994 placing activists in-country to train and empower locally based rights advocates in a dozen countries, and in 1993, he was spokesman for the more than 3,000 NGO representatives at the UN World Conference on Human Rights in Vienna.
Brody then served as Director of the Human Rights Division of the United Nations Observer Mission in El Salvador (ONUSAL) from 1994 until 1995, where he led a staff of human rights officers and police observers responsible for verifying respect for human rights, monitoring compliance with peace accords, and coordinating international support to El Salvador’s judiciary and Human Rights Ombudsman.  He was also a member of the UN Preliminary Mission to establish a human rights verification mission in Guatemala (MINUGUA) in 1994.

In 1995, Brody helped found the Bureau des Avocats Internationaux in Haiti to prosecute human rights crimes committed during de facto military rule. The investigations he began led to the convictions of 57 military and paramilitary officers for the "Raboteau Massacre," the most significant rights prosecution in Haitian history.

Brody served as media liaison for the exiled Tibetan Women's Delegation at the 1995 UN Women’s Conference in Beijing. In 1995, he was expelled from occupied East Timor by Indonesian authorities. He led an Amnesty International fact-finding mission to Sierra Leone (1996). As former Executive Secretary, he was a coordinator of the International Commission of Jurists' report Tibet: Human Rights and the Rule of Law, published in 1997.  He was a member of the U.S. National Criminal Justice Commission, which produced The Real War on Crime, published in 1996.

In 1997, Brody was Deputy Director of the United Nations Secretary General’s Investigative Team in the Democratic Republic of the Congo, charged with probing atrocities committed by troops loyal to Laurent Kabila.

Human Rights Watch 

Brody was with Human Rights Watch from 1998 to 2016 and was an integral part of the organization’s efforts to hold perpetrators of large-scale human rights violations accountable for their crimes.  Most notably, Brody directed Human Rights Watch’s participation in the landmark case of former Chilean dictator Augusto Pinochet before the British House of Lords. Brody credits the Pinochet case as the defining moment in pushing him to pursue similar cases that would serve as a "wake-up call" to tyrants and a “spark of hope for victims.” In the wake of the Pinochet case, Brody began pursuing other former exiled leaders including Hissène Habré of Chad, Mengistu Haile Mariam of Ethiopia, Jean-Claude Duvalier and Raul Cédras of Haiti, and Idi Amin of Uganda.  He wrote the Human Rights Watch booklet The Pinochet Precedent: How Victims can Pursue Human Rights Criminals Abroad.

Brody was an observer at the 2012 trial of Spanish judge Baltasar Garzón. Judge Garzón is best known for using the doctrine of universal jurisdiction to investigate war crimes and torture across national lines, most notably ordering the arrest of Chilean dictator Augusto Pinochet and seeking to indict members of the Bush administration for their role in torturing prisoners. On 9 February 2012, the Supreme Court of Spain convicted Judge Garzón of illegally wiretapping conversations to discover evidence of illicit money laundering tactics being used by suspects and their lawyers.

In April 2010, Brody spoke at a rally of over 60,000 in Madrid’s Puerta del Sol, noting the irony that Judge Garzón was prosecuted for attempting to apply the very principles that he had successfully promoted internationally.  Brody expressed disbelief that Judge Garzón was the first judge in Spain to be put on trial for ordering wiretaps.

In 2010, he assisted the Haitian government in building the case against former dictator Jean-Claude "Baby Doc" Duvalier, and he co-authored the HRW report Haiti’s Rendezvous with History: The Case of Jean-Claude Duvalier.<ref>Human Rights Watch Report, Haiti’s Rendezvous with History: The Case of Jean-Claude Duvalier, April 2011. (pdf)</ref> He is featured in a video on the case produced by Human Rights Watch.

He is author of the July 2011 HRW report Getting Away with Torture which examined the impunity of former US President George W. Bush and other top officials for the widespread mistreatment of Muslim prisoners, and of the book Faut-il Juger George Bush? based on the report. His other reports on counter-terrorism issues include The Road to Abu Ghraib (June 2004), which investigated the roots of the prisoner abuse scandal and The United States’ 'Disappeared' (October 2004), which looked at the long-term incommunicado detention of al-Qaeda leaders in "secret locations".

 Hissène Habré case 

Brody has worked since 1999 with the victims of the former dictator of Chad, Hissène Habré to bring Habré and his accomplices to justice. Habré is accused of thousands of political killings and systematic torture when he ruled Chad from 1982 to 1990 and has been living in exile in Senegal ever since.
 
After what the Toronto Globe and Mail called “one of the world’s most patient and tenacious campaigns for justice" waged by the victims with Brody’s support, Habré’s trial by a special court in Senegal finally began on July 20, 2015 and ended on February 11, 2016. On May 30, 2016, the court convicted Habré for crimes against humanity, including torture, rape and sexual slavery, and sentenced him to life imprisonment. It was the first time ever that a head of state had been prosecuted in the courts of another country. The New York Times, among others, hailed the case as “a Milestone for justice in Africa.” On April 27, 2017, an appeals court confirmed the verdict and ordered Habré to pay approximately 123 million euros in victim compensation.

Also as a result of the victims’ campaign, on March 25, 2015, a Chadian criminal court convicted 20 Habré-era security agents on charges of murder, torture, kidnapping and arbitrary detention.

In November 2021, Brody wrote about the case in “To Catch a Dictator: The Pursuit and Trial of Hissène Habré.” The Washington Post called the book “An absorbing saga that raises a disturbing question: How do brutal fascists like Habré and other murderous heads of state evade a courtroom reckoning for so long after falling from power?”

 Current Work 

Brody is active in human rights causes in the United States. In October 2016, he represented the journalist Amy Goodman, host of the television and radio show Democracy Now!, who was charged with criminal offenses for her reporting on an attack against Native American-led anti-pipeline protesters at Standing Rock, North Dakota. The charges were dropped

In January 2017, Brody was elected to the International Commission of Jurists.

In 2017, he began working with victims of the former dictator of Gambia Yahya Jammeh who is now in exile in Equatorial Guinea. Brody organized a meeting between the victims of Hissène Habré and the victims of Yahya Jammeh and helped launch the “Campaign to Bring Yahya Jammeh and his Accomplices to Justice”- (“#Jammeh2Justice"). In May 2018, he spearheaded an investigation which revealed that 56 West African migrants, mostly from Ghana, had been killed by a death squad taking orders from Jammeh. His June 2019 investigation uncovered the cases of three women who accused Jammeh of rape and sexual abuse. He also helped initiate a criminal case in Argentina against Saudi Arabia’s visiting Crown Prince Mouhamed bin Salman.

 Publications and academia 

In addition to “To Catch a Dictator,” Brody has authored Faut-il Juger George Bush?, The Pinochet Papers: The Case of Augusto Pinochet in Britain and Spain, Tibet: Human Rights and the Rule of Law, and Contra Terror in Nicaragua. His articles have appeared in the International Herald Tribune, Los Angeles Times, Boston Globe, Le Monde, Le Soir, and El País.

Brody has taught law at Columbia University Law School and American University’s Washington College of Law and been a guest lecturer at the law schools of Cornell, Georgetown, Harvard, NYU, Wisconsin and Yale.

 Appearances in films and media 

Brody’s work has been featured in documentaries including “The trial of Hissène Habré, an inconvenient ally” (Al-Jazeera/France24, 2016), Le Chasseur de Dictateurs  (France 2, Complément d'enquête, 2011), Le Chasseur de Dictateurs: Jean-Claude Duvalier (Radio Canada TV, 2011), Hissène Habré: La Traque d’un Dictateur (Canal+, France, 2009), and The Dictator Hunter (directed by Klaartje Quirijns, 2007). Brody has also appeared as an actor in the feature films of his life partner Isabel Coixet, notably “Endless Night” (2015).

He has been profiled in the New York Times ("A 'Bounty Hunter' in Search of Human Justice", October 3, 2002), the Wall Street Journal ("Pinochet Is Freed, But No Ex Dictator Should Feel Safe", March 3, 2000), BBC (“The Dictator Hunter”, May 19, 2016), Jeune Afrique (Dix choses à savoir sur Reed Brody, « le chasseur de dictateurs » qui cible Yahya Jammeh), El Periódico de Catalunya ("Así se caza a un dictador", August 24, 2019), The Daily Telegraph (“Meet the Gambia dictator who ruled with fear, murder and juju... And the man determined to bring him to justice”, June 29, 2018), Le Monde ("Reed Brody, chasseur de dictateurs", January 6, 2006), National Public Radio ('Dictator Hunter' Brody: 'It's A Pleasure, September 26, 2013), Al-Jazeera (South2North - Hunting for justice, August 31, 2013), La Repubblica ("Il cacciatore di dittatori che insegue il Pinochet nero", March 17, 2006), VSD ("Reed Brody, infatigable chasseur de dictateurs", December 19–25, 2007), La Croix ("Rencontre avec...Reed Brody inlassable défenseur des droits de l'homme", September 4, 2004), The National Post (“'Dictator Hunter' vows to bring despots — such as the former ruler of Chad — to trial for human rights abuses”, December 27, 2013), El País (“Una víctima siempre querrá que castiguen al asesino de su padre”, June 16, 2014), El Mundo ('Como judío, la política israelí con los palestinos me deprime', July 20, 2014), El Periódico de Catalunya (“Reed Brody: «España ya no es el templo de la justicia universal»”, July 20, 2014), Esquire (Spain) (Ejecutivo del mes, October 2014), Tages-Anzeiger (“«Die Welt ist kleiner geworden für Diktatoren»”, March 24, 2014), le Nouvel Observateur (“Hissène Habré condamné : le combat de Reed Brody, tombeur de dictateurs”, July 15, 2015), and Le Monde'' (“Reed Brody, le « chasseur de dictateurs » qui a conduit Hissène Habré devant ses juges », July 17, 2015).

References

1953 births
Human Rights Watch people
Living people